Treehouse of Horror, also known as The Simpsons Halloween Specials, is a series of Halloween-themed episodes of the animated sitcom The Simpsons, each consisting of three separate, self-contained segments. These segments usually involve the family in some horror, science fiction, or supernatural setting and always take place outside the normal continuity of the show and are therefore considered to be non-canon.

The original "Treehouse of Horror" episode aired on October 25, 1990 and was inspired by EC Comics Horror tales. From "Treehouse of Horror" (1990) to "X" (1999), every episode has aired in the week preceding or on October 31; "II" and "X" are the only episodes to air on Halloween. Between "XI" (2000) to "XIX" (2008) and "XXI" (2010), due to Fox's contract with Major League Baseball's World Series, episodes had originally aired in November. "XX" (2009) and each Treehouse of Horror episode since "XXII" (2011) has aired in October, with the exception of season thirty two's "XXXI" (2020), which was originally scheduled for October 18, but was postponed to November 1 due to the 2020 NLCS reaching game 7. This was the first time since "XXI" that a Treehouse of Horror episode aired in November.

The first 13 Treehouse of Horror episodes had all three segments written by different writers and in some cases there was a fourth writer that wrote the opening and wraparound segments. The original episode even had three different directors. Starting with season fifteen's "XIV" (2003), only one writer was credited as having written a Treehouse of Horror episode, and the trend has continued through season thirty-three. Season thirty-four’s “XXXIII” (2022) went back to the earlier motion of having three writers.

As of 2022, there are thirty-three Treehouse of Horror episodes, with one airing every year. The 34th season marked the first time two Treehouse of Horror specials were aired, with one episode being a single story and another featuring three segments. The 31st season included a Thanksgiving-themed spinoff, "Thanksgiving of Horror". They are known for being more violent than an average Simpsons episode and contain several different trademarks, including the alien characters Kang and Kodos who have appeared in every episode. Quite often the segments will parody well-known movies, books, radio shows, and television shows. The Twilight Zone has been parodied quite often, and has served as the inspiration for numerous segments.

Episodes

Notes

References

Bibliography

External links
 Official episode guide at the Fox website TheSimpsons.com. Retrieved on October 25, 2010
 Treehouse of Horror I, II, III, IV, V, VI, VII, VIII, IX, X, XI, XII, XIII, XIV, XV, XVI, XVII, XVIII, XIX, XX
 Episode guide from Warren Martyn and Adrian Wood's book "I Can't Believe It's a Bigger and Better Updated Unofficial Simpsons Guide" on the BBC website. November 10, 2007
 Treehouse of Horror I, II, III, IV, V, VI, VII, VIII, IX

Treehouse Of Horror
Treehouse Of Horror
List